Dreaming Now! is the fifty-sixth single by Japanese singer-songwriter Kumi Koda and was released on November 13, 2013. It charted at No. 5 on Oricon, took No. 9 for the weekly ranking and charted for four weeks.

The song was written by Kumi in honor of Japan's part in the "2013 Volleyball World Grand Champion Cup" for men and women, both of which were held in Japan.

The single contained one b-side, "XXX."

Background information
Dreaming Now! is pop/R&B singer-songwriter Kumi Koda's fifty-sixth single under the Avex sub-label Rhythm Zone. It was released on the artist's 31st birthday on November 13. The single debuted at No. 5 and peaked at No. 4 on the Oricon Singles Charts, remaining on the charts for one month. During its four-week run, the single shifted 25,953 units. The single was of a limited release made to honor Japan's part in the "2013 Volleyball World Champion Cup" for men and women.

The single was released in three editions, with each edition carrying different lives for the third track. Standard CD and CD+DVD editions held "XXX" and a live version of "Ai no Uta" to couple the a-side; fan club editions replaced the live of "Ai no Uta" with a live version of "All for you"; on the Hibiya Yagai Anniversary Edition, a live version of "LALALALALA" was used for track three.

Packaging
The single was released in five editions:

CD
CD+DVD
CD+KODA KUMIxEMODA tote bag [Fan Club Edition]
CD+DVD+KODA KUMIxEMODA tote bag [Fan Club Edition]
CD [Hibiya Yagai Anniversary Edition]

Limited editions of the standard CD and CD+DVD came with the live of her 2007 ballad "Ai no Uta," which she performed at ZUSHI FES'13.

Music video
The single's video carried a volleyball theme to support the World Cup, and included a heavy dance number, making it her first video to have a full original dance since 2009's "ECSTASY."

Track List

CD
Dreaming Now!
Lyrics: Koda Kumi
Music: Mitsu J
XXX
Lyrics: Koda Kumi
Music: T-SK • Hiromi Rainbow • Gabriele Guidi • Michela Lombardi
Ai no Uta [LIVE @ZUSHI FES'13]
Lyrics: Koda Kumi • Kosuke Morimoto
Music: Kosuke Morimoto

DVD
Dreaming Now! (Music Video)
Producer: Seki Ryuji • Akihiro Kubo (MFG)
IS THIS TRAP? [Live at a-nation island 2013]
Producer: Akihiro Kubo (MFG)
Dreaming Now! (Making Video)
Producer: Akirhiro Kubo (MFG)

Fan Club Edition
 Dreaming Now!
 XXX
 All for you [Live at Premium Night 〜Love & Songs〜]

Hibiya Yagai Anniversary Edition
 Dreaming Now!
 XXX
 LALALALALA [Live at Summer Trip Live 2013]

Charts

Oricon Sales Chart (Japan)

Alternate Versions
Dreaming Now!
Dreaming Now!: Found on the single (2013) and corresponding album Bon Voyage (2014)
Dreaming Now! [TJO & YUSUKE from BLU-SWING Remix]: Found on Koda Kumi Driving Hit's 6 (2014)

XXX
XXX: Found on the single (2013)
XXX [4 Skips vs. Floorbreaker EDM Remix]: Found on Koda Kumi Driving Hit's 6 (2014)

References

2013 singles
2013 songs
Japanese-language songs
Koda Kumi songs
Rhythm Zone singles
Songs written by Koda Kumi